Ce Ce (foaled March 5, 2016) is an American Champion Thoroughbred racehorse and the winner of the 2020 Apple Blossom Handicap and 2021 Breeders' Cup Filly & Mare Sprint.

Background
Ce Ce is by Elusive Quality out of Bo Hirsch's home-bred Belong to Me mare Miss Houdini, a winner at the Grade 1 level, having taken the Del Mar Debutante Stakes at 2 in 2002. Miss Houdini is also the dam of 2009 Grade II Arkansas Derby winner Papa Clem and is in turn out of the Lord Avie mare Magical Maiden, who was a $26,000 2-year-old purchase by Bo Hirsch's father—the late Clement L. Hirsch—and went on to win the 1991 Grade I Hollywood Starlet and the 1992 Grade I Las Virgenes Stakes earning $903,245. Miss Houdini, trained by Warren Stute, only made a total of four starts at two and three, with earnings of $187,600.

Career

2019: three-year-old season 
Ce Ce's first race was a Maiden Special Weight race on April 12, 2019 at Santa Anita Park, where she came in first. She participated in her first graded race on June 8, 2019, when she came in 4th at the Grade-1 Acorn Stakes.

2020: four-year-old season 
She began her 2020 season with a February 17, 2020 win in an Allowance Optional Claiming race at Santa Anita Park.

On March 14, 2020, she got the biggest win of her career when she won the 2020 Beholder Mile Stakes, edging out Hard Not to Love. 

Ce Ce picked up another Grade-1 win on April 18, 2020, this time in the 2020 Apple Blossom Handicap, besting Ollie's Candy by a head.

On May 31, 2020, Ce Ce finished in third place in the 2020 Santa Maria Stakes behind her rival, Hard Not to Love.

2021: five-year-old season 
Ce Ce started her 2021 season at Santa Anita where she was an easy winner of a seven-furlong allowance optional claiming race in mid-April. That set the table for a stretch-out effort in the -mile  Grade 2 Santa Maria Stakes that didn't pan out. Kept around one turn, Ce Ce shipped to South Florida and was a -length winner of the Grade 2 Princess Rooney Stakes. 

Ce Ce was brought to Saratoga for the Ballerina Stakes against a strong field including champion Gamine. Gamine got off to a good start and set fractions of 23.20, 45.68 and 1:09.20 while Ce Ce tagged along in fourth place. In the end, Ce Ce finished in third place, three lengths behind Gamine in a time of 1:21.39.

Prior to the Breeders' Cup she was a handy winner of the 3 October GIII Chillingworth Stakes at Santa Anita. 

On November 6, again Ce Ce faced Gamine who was a hot 2/5 odds-on favorite in her attempt to repeat winning the Breeders' Cup Filly & Mare Sprint at Del Mar. In a five horse field Ce Ce tracked Gamine and the three-year-old Bella Sofia four wide into the turn, easing out around them on the turn and loomed five wide into the stretch. She cleared them with a furlong remaining and drew away late. For her performances during the year Ce Ce earned US Champion Female Sprint Horse honors.

2022: six-year-old season

Statistics

Pedigree

References

2016 racehorse births
Racehorses bred in Kentucky
Racehorses trained in the United States
Thoroughbred family 12-c
American Grade 1 Stakes winners